A list of episodes for the popular British children's television series Sooty & Co. The show aired from 1993–1998. There were 90 episodes in total.

Episodes

As well as being the voice of Soo, Brenda Longman also appeared as Mo in some episodes.

Series One (1993)

Series Two (1994)

Series Three (1995)

Series Four (1996)

Series Five (1997)

Series Six (1998)

Sooty
Sooty